Gò Công was a former province of the former South Vietnam from 1924 till 1976. It contained the town of Gò Công, now in Tiền Giang province of reunified Vietnam.

History
The area of the Gò Công province was where Trương Định had attacked the French in 1861. The province was separated from Gia Định province by a river boundary.

References

Former provinces of Vietnam
Southeast (Vietnam)
Provinces of South Vietnam